The Thailand women's national basketball team represents Thailand in international women's basketball.

In August 2017,  the team won the silver medal after ceding to Malaysia 60-65 in the 2017 SEA Games women's basketball match at the MABA Stadium in Kuala Lumpur.

Competitions

FIBA Women's Basketball World Cup
Yet to qualify

FIBA Women's Asia Cup

SEABA Championship for Women

Olympic Games
Yet to qualify

Asian Games

Southeast Asian Games

Other Tournaments

Roster 
At the 2019 SEA Games:

3x3 team
At the 2021 FIBA 3x3 Women's Olympic Qualifying Tournament in Austria, Thailand replaced Turkmenistan into the main draw. They entered with some experience on the big stage having competed in the Women's Series two years ago and winning silver at the South East Asian Games 2019. They also reached the quarters of the Asia Cup 2019.

See also

Thailand men's national basketball team
Thailand women's national under-19 basketball team
Thailand women's national under-17 basketball team

References 

 
Women's national basketball teams
national